Khin Ma Gyi (born 25 April 1952) is a Burmese politician and physician currently serves as an Amyotha Hluttaw MP for Kachin State No. 8 constituency. She is a member of the National League for Democracy.

Early life and education
She was born on 25 April 1952 in Monywa, Sagaing Region, Myanmar. She graduated with M.B.B.S. from University of Medicine, Mandalay.

Political career
She is a member of the National League for Democracy. In the 2015 Myanmar general election, she was elected as an Amyotha Hluttaw MP, winning a majority 25580 vote and elected representative from Kachin  State No. 8 parliamentary constituency.

References

National League for Democracy politicians
1952 births
Living people
People from Sagaing Region
University of Medicine, Mandalay alumni